The Fencing competition in the 1977 Summer Universiade was held in Sofia, Bulgaria.

Medal overview

Men's events

Women's events

Medal table

References
 Universiade fencing medalists on HickokSports (Men's Sabre individual result is incorrect. Men's Épée team result is missing)
   A document from Romanian Fencing Federation about Cornel Marin and Marin Mustață.
https://fencing.ophardt.online/en/widget/event/6393 (All events)
https://fencing.ophardt.online/en/search/results-mastercompetition/541 (Men's Sabre individual result)
https://fencing.ophardt.online/en/search/results-mastercompetition/546 (Men's Sabre team result)
https://fencing.ophardt.online/en/search/results-mastercompetition/545 (Men's Épée team result)
https://www.nytimes.com/1977/08/28/archives/world-university-games.html (Men's Épée team result)

1977 Summer Universiade
Universiade
Fencing at the Summer Universiade
International fencing competitions hosted by Bulgaria